Ch'o do Airport is an airport in Ch'odo island, Hanggu-guyok, Nampo, South Pyongan Province, North Korea.

Facilities 
The airfield has a single grass runway 11/29 measuring 3020 x 141 feet (920 x 43 m).  However, other sources state the airfield is 3500 feet long.  It is sited on Ch'o do island off the west coast of North Korea in the Korea Bay.

History

Korean War
 
During the Korean War, the USAF designated the airfield as K-54, but it was often listed as incomplete or not built.

An element of the USAF 3rd Air Rescue Squadron operating Sikorsky H-5s and later Sikorsky H-19s was based on the island from January 1952. Cho-do was regarded as an ideal forward operating base particularly for the rescue of pilots of F-86s damaged over MiG Alley as the F-86 could usually glide to an ejection location near Chodo, often the rescue forces would have to wait for the damaged F-86 to arrive at the rescue location. On 4 April 1953, an H-19 rescued Captain Joseph C. McConnell the future top-scoring US ace in Korea after he ejected from his F-86 just north of Chodo. On 30 April 1953 an H-19 rescued future double-ace Captain Lonnie R. Moore after his F-86F crashed at sea north of Cho-do.

In mid-February 1952 the USAF installed early-warning radar on Cho-do  which could detect aircraft taking off and landing at Chinese airfields along the Yalu River. In May a tactical control center was added and this was used vector F-86s against MiG-15s The base was later used for communications interception duties including providing advance warning of an air attack on Taehwa-do on 30 November leading to a USAF ambush that resulted in the destruction of 12 communist aircraft.

On 5 September 1952 communist artillery shelled the base, injuring six civilians. On 13 October the radar on Cho-do detected six aircraft heading towards the base; these aircraft, believed to be Po-2s, dropped 14 bombs, which killed four civilians. Similar attacks occurred on 26 November and 5 and 10 December causing minimal damage. Another attack took place on 15 April 1953, killing two gunners and destroying one anti-aircraft gun.

UN forces withdrew from Cho-do under the terms of the Korean Armistice Agreement that ended the Korean War on 27 July 1953.

References 

Airports in North Korea
South Pyongan
Nampo
Korean War air bases